Antonio Villamil (born 8 October 1904, date of death unknown) was an Argentine fencer. He competed at the 1928, 1936 and 1948 Summer Olympics.

References

1904 births
Year of death missing
Argentine male fencers
Olympic fencers of Argentina
Fencers at the 1928 Summer Olympics
Fencers at the 1936 Summer Olympics
Fencers at the 1948 Summer Olympics
Pan American Games medalists in fencing
Pan American Games gold medalists for Argentina
Fencers at the 1951 Pan American Games
Medalists at the 1951 Pan American Games